Datuk Tiong Thai King (born 4 July 1945) is a Malaysian politician who served as Member of the Sarawak State Legislative Assembly (MLA) for Dudong from May 2016 to December 2021 and Member of Parliament (MP) for the Lanang from April 1995 to May 2013. He was a member of the federal and state opposition Parti Sarawak Bersatu (PSB) before he quits politics in 2021. Previously he was a member of the Sarawak United Peoples' Party (SUPP), a component party of the federal and state ruling Gabungan Parti Sarawak (GPS) coalition and a former component party of the federal ruling Barisan Nasional (BN) coalition.

Tiong was elected to Parliament in the 1995 general election. In 2004 he was appointed Chairman of the Sibu Municipal Council. He is also a former Senator. In the 2011 Sarawak election, he was nominated as the candidate for the Dudong constituency, but was defeated by Yap Hoi Liong of the Democratic Action Party (DAP) by 317 votes. He failed to defend his federal parliamentary seat at the 2013 general election, losing to Alice Lau Kiong Yieng of the DAP by 8,630 votes.

However, in the 2016 state election, he contested in the Dudong constituency in Sarawak for the second time as direct BN candidate, and he won the seat this time, with the majority of 2,146 votes, beating the incumbent Yap Hoi Liong of DAP, Mary Ting Yiik Hong of State Reform Party (STAR), and 2 independent candidates, Casper Kayong Umping and Dato Sri Dr. Benny Lee.

Tiong officially resigned from the PSB party, effective 1 December 2021, just around the time of 2021 state election.

Personal life
He is the younger brother of Tiong Hiew King, founding chairman of the Rimbunan Hijau Group, an established multinational timber and logging corporation.

Election results

References

1945 births
Living people
People from Sarawak
Malaysian politicians of Chinese descent
Sarawak United Peoples' Party politicians
Members of the Dewan Rakyat
Members of the Dewan Negara
Members of the Sarawak State Legislative Assembly